The 2017–18 Serie A1 is the 99th season of the Serie A1, Italy's premier Water polo league.

Team information

The following 14 clubs compete in the Serie A1 during the 2017–18 season:

Head coaches

External links
 Italian Water Polo Federaration 

Seasons in Italian water polo competitions
Italy
2017 in Italian sport
2018 in Italian sport
2017 in water polo
2018 in water polo